Gerald Joseph Doyle (born 17 February 1965) is a Scottish former footballer who played for Partick Thistle, Alloa Athletic, Stranraer and Dumbarton.

His elder brother Jamie was also a footballer who played for Partick Thistle in the same period, and was later a teammate at Dumbarton.

References

1965 births
Living people
Association football forwards
Association football midfielders
Scottish footballers
Dumbarton F.C. players
Partick Thistle F.C. players
Alloa Athletic F.C. players
Stranraer F.C. players
Scottish Football League players